Jacaranda rufa (syn. Pteropodium hirsutum DC.) is a medicinal plant native to Bolivia and Cerrado vegetation in Brazil. This plant is cited in Flora Brasiliensis by Carl Friedrich Philipp von Martius.

References

External links
The Field Museum: Jacaranda rufa  (photo)

rufa
Trees of Brazil